Artyom Vyacheslavovich Denisenko (born 12 April 1999) is a Belarusian professional footballer, who plays for Belshina Bobruisk.

Honours
Dinamo Brest
Belarusian Super Cup winner: 2019

References

External links 
 
 

1999 births
Living people
Sportspeople from Brest, Belarus
Belarusian footballers
Association football goalkeepers
FC Dynamo Brest players
FC Rukh Brest players
FC Belshina Bobruisk players